Broken Toy Shop is the second album by American singer-songwriter E (a.k.a. Mark Oliver Everett), released in December 1993 by Polydor Records. It was his last record as a solo artist before forming the band Eels.

Track listing 
All songs written by E, except where noted.

 "Shine It All On" (E, Parthenon Huxley) – 4:04
 "Standing at the Gate" – 3:31
 "The Only Thing I Care About" (E, Huxley) – 2:40
 "Manchester Girl" – 3:21
 "L.A. River" (Jennifer Condos, E) – 2:28
 "A Most Unpleasant Man" – 3:18
 "Mass" (Sean Coleman, E) – 3:38 (includes unlisted track "Hello Are You There?")
 "Tomorrow I'll Be Nine" – 2:52
 "The Day I Wrote You Off" – 3:30
 "Someone to Break the Spell" (Anderson, Condos, E, Susanna Hoffs) – 2:51
 "She Loves a Puppet" (Condos, E) – 2:46
 "My Old Raincoat" (E, Huxley) – 3:57
 "Permanent Broken Heart" – 3:28
 "Eight Lives Left" – 2:52

Personnel 
 E – vocals, piano (tracks 1, 4, 6, 9), screaming (1), Hammond B-3 organ (1–3, 6, 8, 9, 14), keyboards (1–3, 6, 9, 12, 13), percussion (1, 8), electric guitar (2, 4, 9, 13, 14), drums (2, 3, 5, 6, 12, 13), glockenspiel (3, 4), tambourine (3, 5, 6, 8–10, 12), melodica (4, 6, 7a), Fender Rhodes (4), Bit One (4), whistle (5), congas (5), slingshot (5), sleigh bells (5), fingersnaps (5), guitar (7b), baby (7b), lead guitar (8), acoustic guitar (14), harmonica (14), accordion (14), celeste (14)

Additional musicians
 Parthenon Huxley – electric guitar (1, 3, 9, 12), acoustic guitar (1, 3, 12), keyboards (1), background vocals (3), rhythm guitar (9), bass guitar (12), Hammond B-3 (12)
 Paul Martinez – bass guitar (1)
 Winston Watson – drums (1, 8–10)
 Patrick Warren – Chamberlin (1, 5, 7a, 10, 14), keyboards (1)
 Chris Solberg – bass guitar (3, 5–7a, 8, 9, 14), organ hi note (3, 8), acoustic guitar (5), electric guitar (5), Hammond B-3 (5, 10), piano (5), fingersnaps (5), glockenspiel (8)
 Michael Koppelman – fingersnaps (5), acoustic guitar (14)
 Sean Coleman – acoustic guitar (7a), electric guitar (7a), piano (7a)
 Richard Greene – violin (7a)
 Jeff Swartz – trombone (7a)
 Rusty Anderson – acoustic guitar (10), electric guitar (10)
 Jennifer Condos – bass guitar (10, 11), background vocals (11)
 Mark Goldenberg – electric guitars (11), keyboards (11), drums (11), 6 string bass solo (11)

Technical
 E – co-producer, string co-arrangements (2, 6, 12, 13), orchestral co-arranger (9), inlay painting, shoe photo
 Michael Koppelman – co-producer, engineer, mixing; additional recording (1)
 Chris Solberg – assistant producer
 Stephen Marcussen – mastering
 Parthenon Huxley – co-producer (1)
 Mike Fennel – engineer (1)
 Mark Goldenberg – co-producer, engineer, mixing (11)
 Brian Soucy – assistant engineer (11)
 Brandon Harris – assistant engineer (11)
 Phil Shenale – string co-arranger, co-orchestrator (2, 6, 12, 13)
 Scott Smalley – co-orchestrator (2, 6, 12, 13)
 John Carter – orchestral engineer (2, 6, 12, 13)
 Paul Buckmaster – orchestral arranger, conductor (4); orchestral co-arranger, conductor (9)
 David Schoeber – orchestral engineer (9)
 Marvin Sanders – MIDI
 Mick Haggerty – art direction, design
 Greg Allen – cover photo
 Steve Samiof – cover photo manipulation
 Terri Phillips – back cover photo
 Hugh Everett III – CD photo

References

Further reading

External links 

 

1993 albums
Eels (band) albums
Polydor Records albums
Albums produced by Mark Oliver Everett
Albums produced by Parthenon Huxley